Beast of Bourbon is the eleventh studio album by German thrash metal band Tankard on 22 March 2004.

Track listing

Personnel
Andreas "Gerre" Geremia - vocals
Andy Gutjahr - guitar
Frank Thorwarth - bass, backing vocals
Olaf Zissel - drums
Additional backing vocals by Chris Luft, Alex Wenzel, and Harald Maul

References 

2004 albums
Tankard (band) albums
AFM Records albums
Albums produced by Andy Classen